Sheikh Muszaphar Shukor Al Masrie bin Sheikh Mustapha (born 27 July 1972) is the first Malaysian astronaut. He launched to the International Space Station aboard Soyuz TMA-11 with the Expedition 16 crew on 10 October 2007. Sheikh Muszaphar flew under an agreement with Russia through the Angkasawan program, and returned to Earth on 21 October 2007, aboard Soyuz TMA-10 with the Expedition 15 crew members, Fyodor Yurchikhin and Oleg Kotov.

Career 
Sheikh Muszaphar was born in Kuala Lumpur, the son of Sheikh Mustapha. He is of Malay, Minangkabau and Arab descent. He attended high school at Maktab Rendah Sains MARA in Muar. He then earned a Bachelor of Medicine and Surgery degree from Kasturba Medical College, an affiliated college of Manipal University, in Manipal, India. 
Sheikh Muszaphar previously worked as an orthopaedic medical officer (MO) but never completed his specialisation. at the Universiti Kebangsaan Malaysia. In 1998, Sheikh Muszaphar worked at Hospital Seremban, followed by a move to Kuala Lumpur General Hospital in 1999, and was on staff at Hospital Selayang from 2000 through 2001. Sheikh Muszaphar is also a part-time model.

Angkasawan program

Sheikh Muszaphar and three other finalists were selected at the beginning of 2006 for the Malaysian Angkasawan spaceflight program. The program arose after Russia agreed to transport one Malaysian to the ISS as part of a multi-billion purchase of 18 Russian Sukhoi Su-30MKM fighter jets by Malaysia. After completing initial training at Star City in Russia, Sheikh Muszaphar and Faiz Khaleed were selected to undergo an 18-month training program in Russia, at the end of which Sheikh Muszaphar was chosen as the prime crew member, while Faiz Khaleed served as back-up. Following the final medical tests and training examinations, on 17 September, it was announced that Sheikh Muszaphar would be flying on the Soyuz TMA-11 mission.

During a NASA news conference with the Expedition 16 crew on 23 July 2007, and news conferences following his selection, Sheikh Muszaphar said he hoped to be able to take various live cell cultures to study during his flight.

Terminology
Flying as a guest of the Russian government, Sheikh Muszaphar's role aboard Soyuz and the ISS is referred to as a spaceflight participant in English-language Russian Federal Space Agency and NASA documents and press briefings.

Speaking to Malaysian media outlets, Alexander Karchava, the Russian ambassador to Malaysia, stated that Sheikh Muszaphar is a "fully-fledged cosmonaut". In an interview with the Malaysian Star newspaper, Robert Gibson, a retired NASA astronaut, shared his opinion that Sheikh Muszaphar is fully qualified as an astronaut, and as such, he should be called one. Gibson also said he regarded Sheikh Muszaphar as a peer.

Spaceflight

Soyuz TMA-11 carrying Whitson, Malenchenko, and Sheikh Muszaphar, successfully launched at 13:22 UTC, Wednesday, 10 October 2007.

After 10 days in space, Sheikh Muszaphar boarded Soyuz TMA-10 for his return. TMA-10 undocked from the ISS at 07:14 UTC on 21 October, and deorbit occurred at 09:47. The trajectory was reported by the crew as soon as they came out of the communications blackout caused by plasma surrounding the spacecraft. A ballistic trajectory is a backup re-entry mode that takes over if something fails during normal re-entry. A Commission of Inquiry determined that the ballistic re-entry was caused by damage to a cable in the spacecraft's control panel, which connected the control panel with the Soyuz descent equipment. Landing occurred at 10:36 GMT, the duration of his flight is 10d 20h 14m.

Space experiments
Sheikh Muszaphar performed experiments on board the International Space Station relating to the characteristics and growth of liver cancer and leukaemia cells, the crystallisation of various proteins and microbes in space.

The experiments relating to liver cancer, leukaemia cells and microbes will benefit general science and medical research, while the experiments relating to the crystallisation of proteins, lipases in this case, will directly benefit local industries.

Lipase are a type of protein enzymes used in the manufacturing of a diverse range of products from textiles to cosmetics, and the opportunity to grow these in space will mean a possibility for Malaysian scientists to take a crack at an industry worth some US$2.2bil (MYR7.7bil) worldwide by producing these locally.

Spaceflight and religion
Since Sheikh Muszaphar is a Muslim, and as his time in space coincided with the last part of Ramadan, the Islamic National Fatwa Council drew up the first comprehensive guidebook for Muslims in space. The 18-page guidebook is titled "Guidelines for Performing Islamic Rites (Ibadah) at the International Space Station", and details issues such as how to pray in a low-gravity environment, how to locate Mecca from the ISS, how to determine prayer times, and issues surrounding fasting. The orbit of the ISS results in one day/night cycle every 90 minutes, so the issues of fasting during Ramadan are also addressed. Sheikh Muszaphar celebrated Eid ul-Fitr aboard the station, and packed some satay and cookies to hand out to the rest of the crew on 13 October 2007 to mark the end of Ramadan.

Legacy
In honour of Sheikh Muszaphar Shukor being the first Malaysian astronaut sent into space, the 2008 ASEAN University Games organising committee had chosen an astronaut as the games mascot, which is named A1 Angkasawan.

Honours

Honours of Malaysia
  :
  Knight Companion of the Order of Loyalty to Negeri Sembilan (DSNS) - Dato' (2008)

See also 
 Timeline of space travel by nationality
 List of Muslim astronauts
 Manipal University alumni

References

External links 

 Spacefacts biography of Sheikh Muszaphar Shukor
 Malaysia's first astronaut to do what no one in space has done before
 Interview with Sheikh Muszaphar from the ISS
 Nils Fischer “Islamic religious practice in outer space.” ISIM review (2008) 22: 39.

Living people
1972 births
People from Kuala Lumpur
Malaysian people of Arab descent
Malaysian people of Malay descent
Minangkabau people
Malaysian people of Minangkabau descent
Malaysian Muslims
Malaysian orthopaedic surgeon
Malaysian astronauts
Manipal Academy of Higher Education alumni
MARA Junior Science College alumni
Mars One
Physician astronauts
Spaceflight participants